The California State Railroad Museum is a museum in the state park system of California, United States, interpreting the role of the "iron horse" in connecting California to the rest of the nation.  It is located in Old Sacramento State Historic Park at 111 I Street, Sacramento.

The museum features 21 restored locomotives and railroad cars, some dating back to 1862. The "Sierra Scene" shows a large scale mockup of a construction scene high in the Sierra Nevada representing Donner Pass circa 1867, featuring the locomotive Gov. Stanford. Other exhibits show how the influence of railroads changed American society, influencing travel, commerce and daily life, as well as the lives of railroaders and the diversity of people who work on railroads. Changing exhibits featuring photography, ephemera, and artifacts from the museum's collection, add depth and incidental information to the overall story of railroad history. The museum has an extensive educational program for elementary students from across the region to help them learn about railroad history using re-enactments, costumed docents, and including train and handcar rides.  The roundhouse area of the museum features a rotating display of locomotives and equipment belonging to the museum.  When not on display, these items are stored and worked on at the nearby Sacramento Railyards in the remaining buildings that were part of the original Southern Pacific Shop complex. A large 3-rail O-gauge model train layout is also located in the museum.

Adjacent to the main museum building is a reconstruction of the 1870s-era Central Pacific Railroad passenger station and freight depot on Front Street, which houses historic and contemporary railroad equipment. In early 2011, the interior remained closed to public use, but is occasionally open for special events. Between April and October, the Sacramento Southern Railroad, operated by the museum, takes passengers on a 40-minute,  roundtrip route along the Sacramento River on a portion of the Walnut Grove branch of the former Southern Pacific Railroad.  The Sacramento Southern Railroad owns the Walnut Grove Branch right-of-way that extends south from Sacramento along the eastern bank of the Sacramento River.  A few miles of track were rebuilt along the levee near Freeport, California as part of a US Army Corps of Engineers project. The CSRRM hopes to one day have a longer excursion line, perhaps as far as Hood, California.  At that location the railroad passengers could disembark the train and take a tourist steamboat back up the Sacramento River to Old Sacramento.

In 1992, Railtown 1897 in Jamestown began operating under the museum.

History
The museum has its origins in 1937, when a group of railroad enthusiasts in the San Francisco Bay Area formed the Pacific Coast Chapter of the Railway & Locomotive Historical Society. This organization worked for years to promote the idea of a railroad museum, donating 30 historic locomotives and cars to the California Department of Parks and Recreation to be the nucleus of a State-operated museum in Sacramento. The museum's first facility, the Central Pacific Railroad Passenger Station, opened in 1976. The Railroad History Museum was completed in 1981. Steam-powered passenger train service on the Sacramento Southern Railroad began in 1984, with the Central Pacific Railroad Freight Depot opening three years later. Railtown 1897 State Historic Park in Jamestown was added to the museum complex during 1992.  The museum became a Smithsonian affiliate in June 2017.

Notable locomotives

Steam locomotives

 Atchison, Topeka and Santa Fe 2925 - Stored, a 4-8-4 type built by Baldwin Locomotive Works in 1944.
 Atchison, Topeka and Santa Fe 1010 - The locomotive was used in the record breaking 44 hour and 54 minute Walter E. Scott's  Scott Special between Los Angeles and Chicago in 1905.  It was used on the segment of the trip between Needles, California, and Seligman, Arizona.
 Atchison, Topeka and Santa Fe 5021 - Stored, a 2-10-4 type built by Baldwin Locomotive Works in 1944.
 Central Pacific No. 1 Gov. Stanford - Cosmetically restored, a 4-4-0 type built by Norris Locomotive Works in 1862.
 Granite Rock No. 10 (Operating as the excursion train ride for the California State Railroad Museum at Old Sacramento, California) a USATC S100 Class 0-6-0T built by Porter in *1942. Occasionally visits other railroads such as the Niles Canyon Railway
 Northwestern Pacific 112 - Stored, a 4-6-0 type built by ALCO in 1908. Sole surviving NWP locomotive.
 North Pacific Coast 12 Sonoma - Cosmetically restored, a  narrow gauge 4-4-0 type built by Baldwin in 1875.  Sole surviving NPC locomotive, and one of only three surviving Baldwin 8/18C class  narrow gauge 4-4-0s.
 Central Pacific No. 3 / Southern Pacific No. 1 C. P. Huntington - Cosmetically restored, a 4-2-4RT type built by Cooke Locomotive Works in 1863.
 Central Pacific No. 233 - Stored, awaiting restoration.  A 2-6-2 tank engine built by Central Pacific's Sacramento Shops in 1882.  Donated 2001 by the Pacific Locomotive Association.
 Southern Pacific 2467 - Display. Restored to operation by members of the Pacific Locomotive Association in 1999, a 4-6-2 type built by Baldwin Locomotive Works in 1921.  On 10-year loan from PLA pending FRA-mandated boiler work.
 Southern Pacific 4294 - Cosmetically restored, a 4-8-8-2 type built by Baldwin Locomotive Works in 1944. Sole surviving "Cab-Forward" locomotive.
 Union Pacific 4466 - Displayed, an 0-6-0 type built by Lima Locomotive Works in 1920 which operated at the museum until 2001.
 Virginia & Truckee 12 Genoa - Baldwin-built 4-4-0 type constructed in 1873. Currently on loan to the Nevada State Railroad Museum. Reportedly in operational condition, though it has not run since May 1979.
 Virginia & Truckee 13 Empire - Baldwin-built 2-6-0 type constructed in 1873, cosmetically restored to its original appearance. Mirrors placed around the engine provide museum visitors with an amazing panoramic view of all sides of the locomotive at once.
 Virginia and Truckee 18 Dayton - 4-4-0 built by the Central Pacific locomotive shops in Sacramento in 1873. On loan from the Nevada State Railroad Museum
 Virginia & Truckee 21 J.W. Bowker - Baldwin-built 2-4-0 switcher constructed in 1875; sole surviving example of this type. On Loan to the Nevada State Railroad Museum.
 Nevada Short Line No. 1 - Baldwin-built  narrow gauge 2-6-0 (Mogul Type) constructed in 1879; on static display with a few cars and rests above all other trains on an elevated track; last time it was run was in 1939-40 for the Golden Gate International Exposition on daily reactments of the 1869 Golden Spike ceremony.

Diesel locomotives

 Amtrak 281 - Operational, an EMD F40PH built in April 1978. Only 1 of 3 Amtrak F40PH(R) locomotives preserved, not counting No. 406, which was converted into an NPCU in 2011 and now used on Amtrak's exhibit train.
 Atchison, Topeka and Santa Fe 347C - Operational, an EMD F7 built in 1949. Sole surviving AT&SF F7 locomotive that was not converted into a CF7.
 Atchison, Topeka and Santa Fe 9820 - Stored, an ALCO RSD-15 "Alligator" built in 1959.
 Sacramento Northern 402 - Operational, an EMD SW1 built in 1939.
 Southern Pacific 1000 - Stored/Awaiting restoration, an EMD SW1 built in 1939, the first diesel fully owned by SP.
 Southern Pacific 5208 - Operational, a BLW DRS66-1500 built in 1949.
 Southern Pacific 6051 - Operational, an EMD E9 built in 1954. Sole surviving SP E9.
 Southern Pacific 6402 - Stored, an EMD F7 built in 1952.
 Southern Pacific 6819 - Operational, an EMD SD45T-2 built in 1972.
 Western Pacific 913 - Operational, an EMD F7 built in 1950.

See also

 California and the railroads
 California heritage railways
 Heritage railway
 List of heritage railways
 List of museums in California

References

External links

 California State Railroad Museum main site
 California State Railroad Museum state parks site

State parks of California
Heritage railroads in California
Museums in Sacramento, California
Railroad museums in California
Museums established in 1976
Old Sacramento State Historic Park
1976 establishments in California
Buildings and structures in Sacramento, California
Model railroads